Needham may refer to:

Places
United States
 Needham, Alabama
 Needham, Indiana
 Needham, Massachusetts, a suburb of Boston
 Needham Line, a commuter rail line in Greater Boston
 Needham (Farmville, Virginia), a historic house

United Kingdom
 Needham, Norfolk, England
 Needham Market, a town in Suffolk, England
 Needham Market F.C., an association football club

Canada
 Halifax Needham, a Canadian electoral district

Other uses
 Needham (surname)
 Needham & Company
 Needham Research Institute
 Needham-Schroeder protocol, a computer network authentication protocol designed for use on insecure network
 Needham (food), a dessert from the U.S. state of Maine